Banmauk or Bamauk  ( is a town in the Sagaing Division in Burma. It is connected by road to Pinlebu which links with Phaungbyin and Kawlin. The township is home to the Shan, Kadu and Kanan ethnic minorities, and the region has witnessed fighting between the Communists and the government troops. There is a famous mount called Santlon. Santlon is Shan Language. It means "Great Elephant".

Notes

External links
Satellite map of Banmauk Maplandia

Township capitals of Myanmar
Populated places in Katha District
Banmauk Township